Semiplotus manipurensis is a species of cyprinid in the genus Semiplotus, that inhabits Manipur, India. It is classified as "data deficient" on the IUCN Red List and is considered harmless to humans.

References

Cyprinid fish of Asia
Freshwater fish of India
IUCN Red List data deficient species